Heavy Heart is an album by American composer, bandleader and keyboardist Carla Bley recorded in 1983 and released on the Watt/ECM label in 1984.

Reception
The Allmusic review by Richard S. Ginell awarded the album 3 stars and stated "while Heavy Heart is a somewhat bright, light-minded album, there are plenty of dark undercurrents to be heard".  The Penguin Guide to Jazz awarded the album 2 stars.

Track listing
All compositions by Carla Bley.
 "Light or Dark" - 6:04  
 "Talking Hearts" - 6:49  
 "Joyful Noise" - 5:08  
 "Ending It" - 6:04  
 "Starting Again" - 5:04  
 "Heavy Heart" - 9:50

Personnel
Carla Bley - organ, synthesizer
Michael Mantler - trumpet  
Steve Slagle - alto saxophone, baritone saxophone, flute  
Gary Valente - trombone
Earl McIntyre - tuba
Kenny Kirkland - piano 
Hiram Bullock - guitar
Steve Swallow - bass guitar  
Victor Lewis - drums
Manolo Badrena - percussion

References

ECM Records albums
Carla Bley albums
1984 albums